Anders Michanek (born 30 May 1943 in Stockholm, Sweden) is a Speedway rider. In 1974 he won the Speedway World Championship in his Swedish homeland with a maximum score of 15 points.

Career
Michanek had a very successful career riding in the British League. He initially signed for the Long Eaton Archers in 1967 before going on to ride for various clubs including Leicester Lions, Newcastle Diamonds, Reading Racers, Ipswich Witches and Cradley Heathens.

Michanek won the World Final in 1974 at the Ullevi Stadium in Gothenburg, and won the Swedish Individual Championship several times. He won the World Long Track Final in 1977 at Aalborg in Denmark.

When Michanek finished second behind Denmark's Ole Olsen in the 1975 World Final at London's Wembley Stadium, it was reported that he was relieved to have relinquished his world title as he had not enjoyed the pressure of being the World Champion. Reports also told that he only started to enjoy the 1975 Final after finishing third in his opening heat behind Olsen and Russian rider Viktor Trofimov knowing that from that point he was not likely to repeat his 1974 win. This was reflected when he came out and won his final four races to finish 2 points behind the undefeated Olsen in second place.

Anders Michanek also won the World Pairs Championship in 1973 in Borås with Bernt Persson, again in 1974 at the Hyde Road Speedway in Manchester with Sören Sjösten, and a third time in succession in 1975 in Wrocław, Poland with Tommy Jansson. He also won the Speedway World Team Cup with Sweden in 1970.

In 1977, Michanek won the Long Track World Championship in Aalborg, Denmark.

World Final Appearances

Individual World Championship
 1967 –  London, Wembley Stadium – 6th – 9pts
 1968 –  Gothenburg, Ullevi – 7th – 9pts
 1970 –  Wroclaw, Olympic Stadium – 9th – 7pts
 1971 –  Gothenburg, Ullevi – 5th – 11pts
 1972 –  London, Wembley Stadium – 7th – 8pts
 1973 –  Chorzów, Silesian Stadium – 10th – 6pts
 1974 –  Gothenburg, Ullevi – Winner – 15pts
 1975 –  London, Wembley Stadium – 2nd – 13pts
 1976 –  Chorzów, Silesian Stadium – Reserve – 2pts
 1977 –  Gothenburg, Ullevi – 8th – 8pts
 1978 –  London, Wembley Stadium – 10th – 7pts

World Pairs Championship
 1971 –  Rybnik, Rybnik Municipal Stadium (with Bernt Persson) – 3rd – 22pts (13)
 1972 –  Borås (with Bengt Jansson) – 4th – 22pts (15+2)
 1973 –  Borås (with Tommy Jansson) – Winner – 24pts (15)
 1974 –  Manchester, Hyde Road (with Sören Sjösten) – Winner – 28pts (14)
 1975 –  Wrocław, Olympic Stadium (with Tommy Jansson) – Winner – 24pts (17)
 1977 –  Manchester, Hyde Road (with Bernt Persson) – 2nd – 18pts (16)

World Team Cup
 1968 –  London, Wembley Stadium (with Ove Fundin / Bengt Jansson / Olle Nygren / Torbjörn Harrysson) – 2nd – 30pts (7)
 1969 –  Rybnik, Rybnik Municipal Stadium (with Bengt Jansson / Soren Sjosten / Ove Fundin / Torbjörn Harrysson) – 4th – 12pts (7)
 1970 –  London, Wembley Stadium (with Ove Fundin / Bengt Jansson / Soren Sjosten) – Winner – 42pts (10)
 1971 –  Wrocław, Olympic Stadium (with Bernt Persson / Soren Sjosten / Bengt Jansson / Leif Enecrona) – 4th – 18pts (9)
 1972 –  Olching, Olching Speedwaybahn (with Tommy Jansson / Christer Lofqvist / Jan Simensen / Göte Nordin) – 4th – 18pts (4)
 1973 –  London, Wembley Stadium (with Bernt Persson / Bengt Jansson / Tommy Jansson) – 2nd – 31pts (11)
 1974 –  Chorzów, Silesian Stadium (with Sören Sjösten / Tommy Jansson / Christer Lofqvist) – 2nd – 31pts (9)
 1975 –  Norden, Motodrom Halbemond (with Tommy Jansson / Bernt Persson / Sören Sjösten / Sören Karlsson) – 3rd – 17pts (8)
 1976 –  London, White City Stadium (with Bernt Persson / Lars-Åke Andersson / Bengt Jansson / Christer Löfqvist) – 3rd – 26pts (11)
 1977 –  Wrocław, Olympic Stadium (with Bengt Jansson / Tommy Nilsson / Bernt Persson / Sören Karlsson) – 4th – 11pts (5)

Long Track World Championship
 1977 –  Aalborg – Winner
 1979 –  Marienbad – 2nd
 1981 –  Radgona – 3rd

References

1943 births
Living people
Swedish speedway riders
Individual Speedway World Champions
Speedway World Pairs Champions
Leicester Lions riders
Reading Racers riders
Ipswich Witches riders
Cradley Heathens riders
Newcastle Diamonds riders
Sportspeople from Stockholm